KWML (570 AM) is a radio station located in Las Cruces, New Mexico. The station is owned by Adams Radio Group, LLC, through licensee Adams Radio of Las Cruces, LLC, and features news from Fox News.  Its studios are located in Las Cruces and its transmitter is located off U.S. Highway 70 (Picacho Avenue) near the Rio Grande.

History
On August 8, 2016, KWML changed their format from sports to oldies, branded as "Kool Oldies 104.5 and AM 570".

Programming
On weekdays, KWML airs programming from local personalities; Scott Brocato mornings, Joey middays, and Jackie afternoons. Weekend programming includes re-airings of The Wolfman Jack Show and Casey Kasem's American Top 40.

Former logo

References

External links

WML
Oldies radio stations in the United States